Michaelerberg is a former municipality in the district of Liezen in Styria, Austria. Since the 2015 Styria municipal structural reform, it is part of the municipality Michaelerberg-Pruggern.

References

Cities and towns in Liezen District